McMenamins is a family-owned chain of brewpubs, breweries, music venues, historic hotels, and theater pubs in Oregon and Washington. Many of their locations are in rehabilitated historical properties; at least nine are on the National Register of Historic Places.  According to the Brewers Association, McMenamins is one of the top 50 largest craft breweries in the United States.

History
McMenamins was founded by brothers Mike and Brian McMenamin, who grew up in northeast Portland, Oregon. They trace the beginning of McMenamins to the 1974 opening of Produce Row Café.

In 1985, McMenamins opened Oregon's first brewpub in the Southwest Portland neighborhood of Hillsdale.   Their first theater pub, and the first in Oregon, was the Mission Theater & Pub (1987). The company then entered the broader hospitality business starting in 1990, when they converted a 74-acre site (that at one time served as the Multnomah County Poor Farm) into McMenamins Edgefield.  By 1997, food accounted for over half of McMenamins' total sales.  The company opened its 55th location in April 2018.

References

External links

 
 McMenamins Brewery Collection, 1985-2013

 
1983 establishments in Oregon
Beer brewing companies based in Portland, Oregon
Culture of the Pacific Northwest
Companies based in Portland, Oregon
Economy of the Northwestern United States
Food and drink companies based in Oregon
Hospitality companies of the United States
Privately held companies based in Oregon
Regional restaurant chains in the United States
Restaurants established in 1983
Restaurants in Oregon
Restaurants in Washington (state)